Karmozd (also Romanized as Kārmozd) is a village in Valupey Rural District, in the Central District of Savadkuh County, Mazandaran Province, Iran. At the 2006 census, its population was 352, in 86 families.

روستای کارمزد در منطقه ولوپی شهرستان سوادکوه واقع شده است و دارای پیشینه ای تاریخی است. بنا به گفته مورخان نام این روستا از نام "هرمز" پادشاه ایران زمین اقتباس شده است و به مرور زمان به "کارمزد" تغییر یافته است

References 

Populated places in Savadkuh County